This is a list of events from British radio in 1928.

Events
2 January – The BBC broadcasts The Daily Service – a 15-minute act of Christian worship – for the first time, from its Savoy Hill studios in London. The programme will still be broadcast five mornings a week on BBC Radio 4 (LW) as of 2020.
November – Live broadcast of National Service of Remembrance in Whitehall, London, first made by the BBC.
24 December – First Festival of Nine Lessons and Carols to be broadcast from King's College Chapel, Cambridge, by BBC Radio.
The BBC Dance Orchestra is formed under the leadership of Jack Payne.

Births
6 June – R. D. Wingfield, novelist and radio dramatist (died 2007)
19 June – Barry Took, comedy writer and broadcast presenter (died 2002)
2 July – John Timpson, journalist and radio presenter (died 2005)
3 July – Edward Greenfield, classical music critic and presenter (died 2015)
13 August – John Tidmarsh, journalist and radio presenter (died 2019)
17 September – Brian Matthew, disc jockey (died 2017)
20 October – Michael O'Donnell, physician, journalist, medical campaigner and broadcaster (died 2019)

References 

 
Years in British radio
Radio